Juhan Luik (born 25 November 1997) is an Estonian alpine ski racer. Luik made his World Cup debut on 26 February 2017. He competed for Estonia at the 2017 FIS Alpine World Ski Championships in the Slalom, Giant Slalom and Super G.

Career
Luik competed for Estonia at the 2014 World Junior Alpine Skiing Championships in Jasná, Slovakia. He failed to finish the second run of the Combined, he finished 83rd in the Super G, 69th in the Downhill and 73rd in the Giant slalom. He competed at the 2016 World Junior Alpine Skiing Championships in Sochi, Russia. He finished 57th in the Downhill, 59th in the Super G and failed to finish the Combined, Giant slalom and the Slalom. He competed at the 2017 FIS Alpine World Ski Championships in St. Moritz, Switzerland. He failed to finish the first run of the Slalom and the Giant slalom, he also failed to finish the Super G. He made his World Cup debut in the Kvitfjell Downhill on 26 February 2017, he finished in 52nd place.

World Championship results

Junior World Championship results

World Cup Results

References

External links

 

1997 births
Estonian male alpine skiers
Living people